The Only She Chapters is a 2011 studio album by Guillermo Scott Herren under his alias of Prefuse 73.

Production
The Only She Chapters includes various female guest vocalists. These include Trish Keenan of Broadcast, Shara Worden of My Brightest Diamond, Zola Jesus, Nico Turner, and Angel Deradoorian of Dirty Projectors.

Release
The Only She Chapters was released by Warp on April 25, 2011. After the release of The Only She Chapters, his eighth album for Warp, the label informed Herren that it would not be releasing any more of his work, ending his relationship with the label. Exclaim! stated that the release of The Only She Chapters alienated a large portion of Herren's fanbase. Herren stated that the album was him wanting to do something different and that he went through a stage in his career where he wanted to do something completely different, and that on "looking back at it, I should have just done it under a different name [laughs]. It really didn't make much sense now that I think about it, it's like 'Damn, I easily could've called this something else and let be its own thing,' because I feel like I unintentionally alienated a lot of my fans that just wanted to hear what I normally do as Prefuse. That, for me, is my biggest regret about it. It's not that I regret the music, I just should have catalogued it differently."

Reception

At Metacritic, which assigns a normalised rating out of 100 to reviews from mainstream critics, the album has received an average score of 68, interpreted as "generally favourable", based on 16 reviews.

Track listing

Personnel
Credits adapted from The Only She Chapters  liner notes.
 Guillermo Scott Herren – producer
 Alejandra Deheza  – vocals on track 14
 Claudia Deheza – vocals on track 14
 Benjamin Curtis – guitar on track 14
 Roberto Carlos Lange – producer on track 14
 Angel Deradoorian – vocals on track 17
 Yuko Michishita – illustration

Notes

2011 albums
Prefuse 73 albums
Warp (record label) albums